The Botswana Premier League, currently known as the BTC Premiership for sponsorship reasons, is the highest level football league in Botswana. Organised by the Botswana Football Association, the league was formed in 1978 to replace the pre-independence Bechuanaland Union African Soccer League, which was regional. Participants in the first edition of the league included Tlokweng Pirates, Notwane, Black Peril, Queens Park Rangers and a team from Ngwaketse district.

The league has always been dominated by the teams that are based south of Dibete or at the southern part of the country until the 2006–07 season when Ecco City Greens made history by becoming the first team from the north to lift the lucrative competition. The league is sponsored by a mobile phone operator Be Mobile to the tune of 30 million pula. After the ABSA premiership in South Africa, the Be Mobile league is the second highest sponsored league in the COSAFA region. The league has continued to grow in leaps and bounds as shown by the increasing number of foreign players in the BPL. Some top players from mainly Zimbabwe like Arnold Chaka, Master Masitara, Elvis Meleka, Mandla Sibanda, Sageby Sandaka and Tendai Ndoro have ditched the Zimbabwean PSL for the BPL in recent years. Recently Namibian stars like Jerome Luis and Benson Shilongo arrived in Botswana in search of the Pula. After terminating their television deal with a South African company RP Productions, the league is now negotiating a long term deal with Supersport International. In early 2013, the pay TV shown five BPL games on a testing basis.

Sponsorship
Since the 1980s the Botswana Premier League has been sponsored. The sponsors have been able to determine the league's sponsorship name. The list below details who the sponsors were and what they called the league:
 1991–2001:Castle Lager (Castle Super League)
 2002–05: St Louis (St Louis Premiership)
 2006–08: Mascom (Mascom Premiership)
 2009–13: be Mobile (be Mobile Premiership)
 2010–present: BTC (BTC Premiership)

Format
During the league, from August to May, each club plays each of the other teams twice; once at home and once away, totaling 30 games for each team by the end of the season. Therefore, in Botswana football a true round-robin format is used. In the first half of the season, each team plays once against each league opponent, for a total of 15 games. In the second half of the season, the teams play in exactly the same order that they did in the first half of the season, the only difference being that home and away situations are switched. Since the 1994–95 season, teams were awarded three points for a win, one point for a draw, and no points for a loss.
Since Botswana is lowly ranked in the CAF rankings only one CAF Champions League spot is awarded to the league champions. The cup winners gain a spot in the CAF Confederation Cup.

Since the 2005–06 season if two or more teams end the league with the same number of points, the deciding tie-breakers used are (in order):
Head-to-head records;
Goal difference of head-to-head records;
Goal difference of league;
Most goals for in league;
Draw

Broadcasting rights
In Botswana the Botswana Football Association is the one which negotiates the broadcasting rights with broadcasters. Starting from 2002–03 until 2012–13 the broadcasting rights were held by the state broadcaster Botswana Television (BTV) and its radio partner Radio Botswana (RB1). The state broadcaster was paying P5 million per season for the rights. Broadcasting of the games was irregular as the TV showed majority of games played in and around Gaborone citing poor quality stadiums in the north. Two weekend games are shown live on TV, with midweek games being delayed.

SuperSport deal
In 2013 there was major excitement when South African broadcasting giant entered the local market. The deal saw the state broadcaster temporarily losing the rights, as a few games were shown on pay-per-view. However it was short lived as SuperSport and the BFA parted their ways. Broadcasting resumed normally on BTV and RB1.

Hourlies
Since 1980 all BPL games have been played at the same times. On Saturday most are played 15:00 pm CAT on winter and 16:00 pm CAT in summer. Few games are played at night due to poor lighting in most stadiums. In Sunday all games are played at 15:00 pm CAT or 16:00 pm CAT depending on the season.

Most in midweek games are played at 19:00 pm CAT.

Current season clubs (2022−23)

Champions
Previous champions are:

1966: Not known
1967: Gaborone United
1968: Not known
1969: Gaborone United
1970: Gaborone United
1971–77: Not known
1978: Notwane PG
1979: Township Rollers
1980: Township Rollers
1981: Botswana Defence Force XI
1982: Township Rollers
1983: Township Rollers
1984: Township Rollers
1985: Township Rollers
1986: Gaborone United
1987: Township Rollers
1988: Botswana Defence Force XI
1989: Botswana Defence Force XI
1990: Gaborone United
1991: Botswana Defence Force XI
1992: LCS Extension Gunners
1993: LCS Extension Gunners
1994: LCS Extension Gunners
1995: Township Rollers
1996: Notwane PG
1997: Botswana Defence Force XI
1998: Notwane PG
1999: Mogoditshane Fighters
1999–00: Mogoditshane Fighters
2000–01: Mogoditshane Fighters
2001–02: Botswana Defence Force XI
2003: Mogoditshane Fighters
2003–04: Botswana Defence Force XI
2004–05: Township Rollers
2005–06: Police XI
2006–07: ECCO City Greens
2007–08: Mochudi Centre Chiefs
2008–09: Gaborone United
2009–10: Township Rollers
2010–11: Township Rollers
2011–12: Mochudi Centre Chiefs
2012–13: Mochudi Centre Chiefs
2013–14: Township Rollers
2014–15: Mochudi Centre Chiefs
2015–16: Township Rollers
2016–17: Township Rollers
2017–18: Township Rollers
2018–19: Township Rollers
2019-20: Jwaneng Galaxy
2020–21: Not held
2021-22: Gaborone United

Past seasons

Manager records

League winning managers

Coach of the Season

Performance By Club

Topscorers

Player of the Season

References

External links
League at fifa.com
http://www.yeswefoot.com/botswana/
Botswana Premier League summary(SOCCERWAY)

 
Football competitions in Botswana
Botswana
1966 establishments in Botswana